Jagat Taran Golden Jubilee School is located in George Town, Allahabad, Uttar Pradesh. The School is affiliated to Central Board of Secondary Education situated at New Delhi.

History 
The school was established by J.T Education Society and claims to be the oldest CBSE school in the Allahabad city of Uttar Pradesh.

Programmes 
The school offers three programmes as per the norms from the CBSE and CCE (Continuous and Comprehensive Evaluation) pattern. These programmes includes:
 Science
 Commerce
 Humanities (Arts)

References

External links 
 

Schools in Allahabad
CBSE Delhi
High schools and secondary schools in Uttar Pradesh